Lovejoy is a British television series starring Ian McShane.

Lovejoy may also refer to:
 Lovejoy (novel series), a series of novels by Jonathon Gash, from which the television series was adapted

Places
 Lovejoy, California
 Lovejoy, Georgia
 Lovejoy, Illinois or Brooklyn
 Lovejoy Lake, a lake in Minnesota
 Lovejoy, Missouri

Comets
 C/2007 K5 (Lovejoy), a comet discovered in 2007
 C/2007 E2 (Lovejoy), a comet discovered in 2007
 C/2011 W3 (Lovejoy), a comet discovered in 2011 which was noted for its pass through the sun's corona
 C/2013 R1 (Lovejoy), a comet visible to the naked eye in 2013
 C/2014 Q2 (Lovejoy), a comet discovered in 2014
 C/2017 E4 (Lovejoy), a comet discovered in 2017 by Terry Lovejoy

Other uses
 Lovejoy (surname)
 A Lovejoy, a 2016 album by Omar Rodríguez-López
 Lovejoy (album)
 Lovejoy (band), English indie rock band

See also 
 Lovejoy coupling, a power transmission coupling
 Battle of Lovejoy’s Station in the American Civil War
 East Lovejoy, Buffalo, New York